Elusa inventa is a species of moth of the family Noctuidae. It was described by Emilio Berio in 1977, and is known from China.

References

Moths described in 1977
Hadeninae
Moths of Asia